The 2009 Twenty20 Cup was the seventh Twenty20 Cup competition for English and Welsh county clubs. The finals day took place on 15 August at Edgbaston, and was won by the Sussex Sharks.

Fixtures and results

Group stage

Midlands/Wales/West Division

North Division

South Division

Knockout stage

Quarter-finals

Finals Day

Semi-finals

Final

See also
Twenty20 Cup
Friends Provident t20
2008 Twenty20 Cup

References

External links
 ESPN CricInfo site

 
Twenty20 Cup
Twenty20 Cup

mr:२००९ २०-२० चषक